Flower of Love is a compilation budget album by American country artist Lynn Anderson. It was released circa 1971 via Pickwick Records but is often credited as a 1973 release, the year of its release on 8 track tapeand was produced by Slim Williamson. It was her first compilation release for the Pickwick label, reissues of songs Anderson recorded at Chart Records during her years at the label.

Background, release and reception
Flower of Love featured songs Anderson originally released while recording for Chart Records in the 1960s. Most of the songs included on the compilation are cover versions of the originals by other artists. Examples of this include the title hit by Leon Ashley,  Connie Smith's "Once a Day," Tammy Wynette's "Stand by Your Man," Dottie West's "Paper Mansions" and Merle Haggard's "Okie from Muskogee." In the original recording sessions, these songs were produced by Slim Williamson, Anderson's longtime producer at Chart. A total of ten tracks were included on the album. Anderson's mother, Liz Anderson, was the composer of "Lie a Little" and a "Penny for Your Thoughts."

Greg Adams of Allmusic, who gave it 2.5 out of 5 stars. He found the package to be a "budget" release and found some cover versions to be "too close to the originals." "Because these songs are duplicated on earlier albums, Flower of Love is of limited value," he concluded.

Track listing

Personnel
All credits are adapted from the liner notes of Flower of Love.

Musical and technical personnel
 Lynn Anderson – lead vocals
 John Sturdivant, Jr. – liner notes
 Slim Williamson – producer

Release history

References

1973 albums
Albums produced by Slim Williamson
Lynn Anderson compilation albums
Pickwick Records compilation albums